Agyneta darrelli is a species of sheet weaver found in Canada and the United States. It was described by Dupérré in 2013. The species was named after arachnologist Darrell Ubick.

References

darrelli
Spiders of Canada
Spiders of the United States
Spiders described in 2013